The 2022–23 UMass Lowell River Hawks Men's ice hockey season is the 56th season of play for the program. They will represent the University of Massachusetts Lowell in the 2022–23 NCAA Division I men's ice hockey season for the 39th season in the Hockey East conference. The River Hawks are coached by Norm Bazin, in his 12th season, and play their home games at Tsongas Center.

Season

Departures

Recruiting

Roster
As of September 14, 2022.

|}

Standings

Schedule and results

|-
!colspan=12 style=";" | Regular Season

|-
!colspan=12 style=";" | 

|-
!colspan=12 style=";" | Regular Season

|-
!colspan=12 style=";" |

Scoring statistics

Goaltending statistics

Rankings

USCHO did not release a poll in weeks 1 and 13.

References

2022-23
UMass Lowell
UMass Lowell
UMass Lowell
UMass Lowell